Dead Magic is the fourth studio album by Swedish musician Anna von Hausswolff. It was released on 2 March 2018 on City Slang.

Track listing

Personnel
Musicians
Anna von Hausswolff – vocals, pipe organ, Mellotron
Filip Leyman – synthesizer
Karl Vento – guitar
Joel Fabiansson – guitar
David Sabel – bass guitar
Ulrik Ording – drums
Shahzad Ismaily – percussion 
Úlfur Hansson – string arrangements 
Gyda Valtysdottir – strings
Randall Dunn – Mellotron, Korg MS-20, sound designer

Production
Randall Dunn – production, mixing
Jason Ward – mastering

Design
Anna von Hausswolff – design, layout, inner sleeve drawing
Magnus Andersson – layout
Maria von Hausswolff – cover photograph

Charts

References

2018 albums
Anna von Hausswolff albums
City Slang albums
Albums produced by Randall Dunn
Experimental rock albums by Swedish artists
Heavy metal albums by Swedish artists
Dark wave albums